Georg Hieronymus Roderich Stintzing (12 February 1854 – 5 April 1933) was a German internist born in Heidelberg.

Stintzing studied medicine at the Universities of Bonn, Leipzig and Tübingen, receiving his doctorate in 1878 at Bonn. Following graduation he remained in Bonn as an assistant in the institute of physiology of Eduard Pflüger (1829-1910). Later he was an assistant to Hugo von Ziemssen (1829-1902) at the medical clinic in Munich, and in 1890 became an associate professor and director of the medical clinic at the University of Jena.

In 1892 Stintzing attained the title of "full professor" at Jena. One of his better known assistants was internist Ferdinand Gumprecht (1864-1947).

"Stintzing's tables" are tables containing readings on the electrical excitability of nerves and muscles in normal individuals.

Written works  
With Franz Penzoldt (1849-1927), he was co-editor of the six volume "Handbuch der speciellen Therapie innerer Krankheiten" (1894–96).
 1. Bd. "Infektionskrankheiten" – Infectious diseases.
 2. Bd. "Vergiftungen; Stoffwechsel-, Blut-, und Lymphkrankheiten" – Metabolic, blood and lymphatic diseases.
 3. Bd. "Erkrankungen der Atmungsorgane und der Kreislaufsorgane" – Diseases of the respiratory system and the circulatory organs. 
 4. Bd. "Erkrankungen der Verdauungsorgane" – Disorders of the digestive organs.
 5. Bd. "Erkrankungen des Bewegungsapparates und des Nervensystems; Geisteskrankheiten" – Diseases of the musculoskeleton and nervous system. Mental illness.
 6. Bd. "Venerische Krankheiten; Erkrankungen der Harn- und Geschlechtswerkzeuge, sowie der Haut" –  Venereal diseases; diseases of the urinary and sexual organs. Skin diseases.

References 
 Pagel: Biographisches Lexikon (biography)

Academic staff of the University of Jena
1854 births
1933 deaths
German internists
University of Bonn alumni
Physicians from Heidelberg